Night Songs is the debut studio album by American glam metal band Cinderella. It was released on June 9, 1986, by Mercury Records. Mercury issued the album worldwide, while Vertigo Records handled the album's release in the UK.

The album peaked at No. 3 on the US charts on February 7, 1987, and was certified double platinum for shipping 2 million copies there twelve days later. In May 1991, it was certified triple platinum, having shipped 3 million copies.

Leadoff single "Shake Me" failed to chart, but "Nobody's Fool" cracked the Top 20, reaching No. 13. Third single "Somebody Save Me" went to #66. On May 4, 1987, Cinderella filmed parts of their concert in Philadelphia. These live songs were, along with their three MTV videos, released on home video in August 1987 on Night Songs: The Videos.

Night Songs sold several million copies due to a combination of Cinderella's breakthrough single "Nobody's Fool", MTV airplay, and an opening slot on labelmates Bon Jovi's tour, in support of their album Slippery When Wet.

Critical reception

The album received mixed reviews. David Fricke, writing for Rolling Stone magazine, considered that "[Cinderella] need to jazz up their material and cut away the clichés if they're really interested in hard-rock immortality. Otherwise, their platinum dreams are going to turn into pumpkins". AllMusic reviewer Steve Huey called it "not bad, just generic". Canadian journalist Martin Popoff put on a par Cinderella's rise to prominence with Poison's success, judging them as "little more than vacant, colourful but life-affirming [Mötley] Crüe derivatives." He described the songs as "heavier than one might expect, but of course safe, shallow and watery like the kiddie pool."

The album has been retrospectively considered a hair-metal classic, being ranked on a vast amount of "best of" lists.

Legacy
After the release of this album, the band slightly changed their sound to fit a more blues rock direction. In October 2014 for her birthday, guitarist Tom Keifer presented Lzzy Hale of Halestorm with the costume jewelry pin he wore on his right shoulder for the Night Songs album cover. Hale subsequently wore the pin on her right hip on the album cover for Halestorm's 2015 Into the Wild Life, to include a touch of tradition.

Track listing 
All songs written by Tom Keifer.

Personnel 
Cinderella
 Tom Keifer – lead vocals, guitar, piano
 Jeff LaBar – guitar, vocals
 Eric Brittingham – bass, vocals
 Fred Coury – drums (does not play on the album, joined shortly after it was recorded)

Additional musicians
 Barry Benedetta – lead guitar on "Back Home Again", "Nothin' for Nothin'" and "Push, Push"
 Jeff Paris – keyboards
 Jody Cortez – drums on all tracks
 Tony Mills – background vocals
 Jon Bon Jovi – background vocals on "Nothin' for Nothin'" and "In from the Outside"
 Bill Mattson – background vocals on "Shake Me"

Production
 Andy Johns – producer, engineer, mixing at the Record Plant, Los Angeles
 David Glover, Joe Hauserman, Mark McKenna, Nick Didia, Paul Wertheimer – assistant engineers
 Mark "Weissguy" Weiss – photography/cover concept

Charts

Album

Singles
Shake Me

Nobody's Fool

Somebody Save Me

Certifications

Accolades

References

Cinderella (band) albums
1986 debut albums
Albums produced by Andy Johns
Mercury Records albums
Vertigo Records albums